Shane Reck (born 1997) is an Irish hurler who plays for Wexford Senior Championship club Oylegate-Glenbrien and at inter-county level with the Wexford senior hurling team. He usually lines out as a left wing-back.

Playing career

Institute of Technology, Carlow

As a student at the Institute of Technology, Carlow, Reck joined the senior hurling team during his second year. He has since lined out for the institute in several Fitzgibbon Cup campaigns.

Oylegate-Glenbrien

Reck joined the Oylegate-Glenbrien club at a young age and played in all grades at juvenile and underage levels before eventually joining the club's top adult team in the Wexford Intermediate Championship.

On 15 October 2016, Reck lined out at right wing-back when Oylegate-Glenbrien faced Adamstown in the Wexford Intermediate Championship final. He ended the game with a winners' medal following the 1-14 to 0-10 victory which secured promotion to the top flight of Wexford hurling.

Wexford

Under-21

Reck first played for Wexford when he was drafted onto the under-21 team in advance of the 2017 Leinster Championship. He made his first appearance for the team on 21 June 2017 when he lined out at left corner-back in a 3-16 to 1-12 defeat of Carlow. On 5 July 2017, Reck was again named at left corner-back when Wexford suffered a 0-30 to 1-15 defeat by Kilkenny in the Leinster final.

Senior

Reck joined the Wexford senior team in advance of the 2019 National League. He made his first appearance for the team on 27 January 2019 when he came on as a 21st-minute for Conor Firman at left corner-back in a 1-17 to 2-11 defeat by Limerick. Reck made his Leinster Championship debut on 19 May 2019 when he was again introduced as a substitute for Shaun Murphy in a 2-19 to 1-22 draw with Dublin. On 30 June 2019, he won a Leinster Championship medal when he lined out at left wing-back when Wexford defeated Kilkenny by 1-23 to 0-23 in the final.

Career statistics

Honours

Oylegate-Glenbrien
Wexford Intermediate Hurling Championship (1): 2016

Wexford
Leinster Senior Hurling Championship (1): 2019

References

1997 births
Living people
Oylegate-Glenbrien hurlers
Wexford inter-county hurlers
Hurling backs